is a Japanese manga based on a concept by Masamune Shirow and written and illustrated by Kōshi Rikudō. The manga began serialization in Kadokawa Shoten's Newtype Ace magazine from October 2012, later moving to the Niconico Ace web publication, and is licensed in English by Seven Seas Entertainment. An anime adaptation has been produced by Studio Gokumi and AXsiZ. It was first released as a film in theaters in December 2015. It aired as a television series between 8 January and 25 March 2016.

Plot
Nene Nanakorobi, a full conversion cyborg, dreams of attaining world peace. She is traveling on a cruise ship towards Cenacle, a scenic artificial island when she meets Uzal Delilah, an eccentric scientist. The two become fast friends along with Uzal's cyborg pet Clarion, a cat-like combat android, who Nene immediately takes a liking to.

After they part ways, a terrorist attack of unknown origin threatens to shatter Nene and Clarion's friendship. In a desperate attempt to save her new friend, Uzal gives Nene the ability to use a device known as the Pandora Device, which is found inside Clarion's body. This allows Nene to master skills and abilities unlike anything seen before in the advancing world.

Working together, Nene and Clarion partake in various missions - from saving children caught in shopping mall fires to fighting reckless criminals - all for the sake of world peace. But achieving this goal is not going to be easy. B.U.E.R., a sapient robot in the form of a five-legged lion-esque figure, threatens to turn their life upside down with his perverted nature and uncontrollable power. To make matters worse, Nene's guardian and genius scientist, Takumi Korobase has an undying interest in B.U.E.R.

Torn between saving the world and keeping B.U.E.R. out of the wrong hands, Nene and Clarion's goal of achieving world peace seems like a pipe dream. With this Herculean task, it is up to them to complete their goal, or risk getting their friendship destroyed in the process.

Characters

A cyborg whose whole body is artificial. She comes to Cenancle to live with her aunt. Before her conversion into a cyborg, Nene was a normal young girl who came down with an incurable sickness. The only way to save her was to become the world's first full conversion cyborg. By placing her fingers inside Clarion's body, she is able to use the Pandora Device, which allows her to master any skill for a short period of time. These range from wielding firearms to cookery. She is also able to transfer her brain between different artificial bodies.

Uzal's companion, who is a combat android, disguising as a full-body cyborg. Her body holds the Pandora Device, which temporarily grants Nene enhanced abilities. She is a skilled fighter who often finds herself at the mercy of Nene's admiration and hates having her cat-like ears touched.

A wealthy inventor who manipulates Nene into working with Clarion to solve the mystery behind the attack. She also goes by the name .

A giant boring robot owned by Uzal's company that possesses a giant laser. While its main body resembles a giant eyeball, its Central Nervous Unit, which detaches itself after the main body is shut down, takes the form a gentlemanly but perverted lion-esque creature with five legs. He tends to be injured by Clarion when acting perverted, or locked in a safe-box to stop Takumi from disassembling and  analyzing him, but the darkness traumatizes him.

Nene's aunt who lives on Cenancle Island and is close friends with Uzal. Takumi is usually overwhelmed with social anxiety and has to hide behind her Gertsecommas whenever somebody sees her face-to-face. She does all her work in cyberspace and never leaves her mansion. The fact that her company produces Gertsecommas which were invented by Uzals company as well as her four-colored hairpin hint that her relationship with Uzal is somewhat like that of Bill Gates with Steve Jobs.

A television reporter who always get interrupted before she can state her name.

A leader of a group of cosplaying rebels against Uzal. She dresses up as a bunny girl.

A captain of the Cenacle Island military. He's a very kind man who likes helping people.

A mysterious man obsessed with the passing of time, who secretly starts unearthing the BUER main body.

A girl with a prosthetic leg that befriends BUER, and later Nene and Clarion.

An old woman with a prosthetic arm and heart who is saved by Nene and Clarion during a network outage.

Dr. Toto

The chairman of the government of Cenacle Island. He along with his secretary were rescued by Nene and Clarion when the island's main department store was attacked. It is implied that he takes bribes and is extremely egocentric.

Media

Manga
The manga, written and illustrated by Kōshi Rikudō and based on a concept by Masamune Shirow, began publication in Kadokawa Shoten's Newtype Ace magazine on 10 October 2012.  When Newtype Ace ceased publication on 10 July 2013, the series was transferred to Kadokawa's Niconico Ace website, where it resumed publication on 17 September 2013. The series has entered its final arc with the release of its 24th volume in February 2023. Seven Seas Entertainment licensed the series for publication in North America.

Volumes

Anime
An anime adaptation by Studio Gokumi and AXsiZ was announced in Kadokawa's Gundam Ace magazine in October 2015. The anime is directed by Munenori Nawa written by Tatsuya Takahashi with character design by Takuya Tani. The anime was first released as a film, which received a limited two-week theatrical release starting on 5 December 2015, before airing as a television series on Tokyo MX between 8 January 2016 and 25 March 2016. The opening theme is "hopeness" by Zaq, while the ending theme song is  performed by Sanae Fuku and Manami Numakura. The series is licensed in North America by Funimation, who simulcast the subtitled version as it aired and streamed a broadcast dub version from 12 February 2016, and in Australia by Madman Entertainment, who are streaming the series on AnimeLab.

Episode list

References

External links

  at Niconico Ace
  
  at Seven Seas Entertainment
 

AXsiZ
Comedy anime and manga
Cyberpunk anime and manga
Funimation
Kadokawa Shoten manga
Kadokawa Dwango franchises
Madman Entertainment anime
Masamune Shirow
Postcyberpunk
Seinen manga
Seven Seas Entertainment titles
Studio Gokumi